Évelyne Grandjean (born 7 April 1939 in Versailles) is a French stage, cinematic and television actress, playwright and television writer, and radio host.

She has been also a prolific voice actress for many French-dubbed versions of foreign films and TV series, including 101 Dalmatians: The Series (as Spot, Princess and Nanny), Alfred J. Kwak (as Kwak), The Animals of Farthing Wood (as Adder the Snake), Around the World in Eighty Dreams (as Grandma Tadpole), Babar (as Celeste), A Bug's Life (as Dr. Flora), The Cat Returns (as Natoru), Chicken Run (as Bunty), Cinderella II: Dreams Come True (as Fairy Godmother), Cutey Honey (as Sister Jill), Dr. Slump (as Arale Norimaki), Elvira, Mistress of the Dark (as Elvira), The Flintstones (as Wilma Flintstone), Grey's Anatomy (as Ellis Grey), Ice Age: Continental Drift (as Granny), James and the Giant Peach (as Sponge and Ladybug), The Jetsons (as Jane and Rosie), Maple Town (as Patty Rabbit), Monsters, Inc. (as Ms. Flint), Muppet Treasure Island (as Mrs. Bluberidge), Princess Gwenevere and the Jewel Riders (as Lady Kale), and Princess Knight (as Heckett the witch).

Theater

Filmography

Dubbing

External links

1939 births
20th-century French actresses
21st-century French actresses
French women dramatists and playwrights
French film actresses
French stage actresses
French television actresses
French television writers
French voice actresses
French video game actresses
Living people
People from Versailles
French women writers 
Women television writers